The Brentmore at 88 Central Park West, on the Upper West Side of New York City, is an apartment building that faces the west side of Central Park. It is on the southwest corner of 69th Street.

The Brentmore is in the Upper West Side-Central Park West Historic District which has been established by the New York City Landmarks Preservation Commission; and it is a contributing property to the federally designated Central Park West Historic District.

History
The beige brick Brentmore was built in 1910.

Notable residents
Notable residents of the Brentmore have included:

 Clive Davis, producer
 Celeste Holm, actress
 Sean Lennon
 Lorne Michaels, director
 Robert De Niro, actor
 Paul Simon, musician
 Sting, musician
 Harvey Weinstein, producer

See also
 Central Park West Historic District
 List of properties (Central Park West Historic District)

References

External links
 88 Central Park West at CityReview.com
 The Brentmore at Emporis.com

Residential buildings completed in 1910
Central Park West Historic District
Historic district contributing properties in Manhattan
Residential buildings on the National Register of Historic Places in Manhattan
Upper West Side
1910 establishments in New York City